The  is a DC electric multiple unit (EMU) train type operated in Japan by the third sector railway operator Echizen Railway since February 2013. Converted from former 119 series EMUs operated by JR Central until 2012, a total of six 2-car sets are scheduled to be introduced between fiscal 2012 and 2013, replacing the older 1101 series, 2101 series, and 2201 series trains.

Design
The 7000 series trains were converted from former 119 series 2-car EMUs operated by JR Central on the Iida Line until they were withdrawn from service in March 2012. Modifications included the following changes:
 Removal of front-end gangway connections
 Addition of new headlights above the cab-end centre doors
 Addition of front-end skirts
 Addition of single-arm pantographs
 Removal of toilets
 Repainting into the standard Echizen Railway livery

Formations
As of 1 April 2013, three two-car sets are in service, formed as follows, with one motored driving (Mc) car and one non-powered driving trailer (Tc) car.

The MoHa 7000 cars are fitted with two single-arm pantographs.

Interior
Passenger accommodation retains the original mixture of longitudinal bench seating and transverse 4-seat bays used in the 119 series. The toilet originally fitted to the KuHa car has been removed.

History
The first set, 7001 + 7002 entered service on 4 February 2013, the second set, 7003 + 7004, entered service on 3 March 2013, and the third set, 7005 + 7006, entered service on 18 March 2013. Three more two-car sets are scheduled to be introduced during fiscal 2013.

Build details

References

Electric multiple units of Japan
Train-related introductions in 2013

ja:国鉄119系電車#譲渡
600 V DC multiple units